Anna Dulce (born 22 October 2005) is a Moldovan sports shooter. She competed in the women's 10 metre air pistol event at the 2020 Summer Olympics, held July–August 2021 in Tokyo, Japan.

References

External links
 

2005 births
Living people
Moldovan female sport shooters
Olympic shooters of Moldova
Shooters at the 2020 Summer Olympics
Sportspeople from Chișinău
21st-century Moldovan women